The 12th of the Line (Prince Leopold) – 13th of the Line Battalion is an infantry unit in the Land Component of the Belgian Armed Forces. It maintains the traditions of the 12th Regiment of the Line and 13th Regiment of the Line. From 2011 until 1 January 2017 the regiment was a part of the Light Brigade and on that date  the regiment joined the Motorized Brigade.

History

12th Regiment of the Line
The 12th Regiment of the Line is the oldest active Belgian infantry regiment. It was created on 31 March 1831, and since 1984 has been authorised to bear the title "Prince Leopold" which was originally bestowed on it in 1915, during the First World War.

The badge of the 12th Regiment of the Line was based on the coat of arms of the city of Liège where the regiment had its barracks. It depicted the city's perron column.

13th Regiment of the Line
The 13th of the Line was founded in 1874. It was disbanded in 1947, but in 1976 it reformed as an anti-tank regiment.

Amalgamation
In 1993, the 12th of the Line and the 13th of the Line were merged to form the 12th Battalion of the Line "Prince Leopold" – 13th of the Line.

Standard

The standards of the unit carry the following citations:
For the 12th Regiment of Line:
Liège
Anvers
Dixmude
Yser
Merckem
La Lys
Campaign of 1914-1918
La Lys 1940

For the 13th Regiment of Line:
Namur [1914]
Termonde
Yser
Merckem
Zarren
Handzaeme
La Lys 1940

As well as a fourragère of the Order of Leopold.

Organisation

The 12/13th Battalion of the Line comprises: 
HQ staff 
 1st company
 2nd company 
 3rd company
4th company (reserve company)
service company

Lineage

|-style="text-align: center; background: #F08080;"
| align="center" colspan="20"|Lineage
|-
| width="20%" colspan="15" align="center"| 12th Regiment of the Line  "Prince Leopold"
| width="20%" colspan="5" rowspan="2" align="center" |12th-13th Battalion of the Line
|-
| width="20%" colspan="1" align="center"| 
| width="20%" colspan="14" align="center"|13th Regiment of the Line

References

Sources

Prince Leopold
Military units and formations established in 1993
1993 establishments in Belgium
Organisations based in Belgium with royal patronage